Jungle Bride is a 1933 American pre-Code film directed by Harry O. Hoyt and Albert H. Kelley.

Plot

Doris Evans suspects that an actor has committed murder, so she and her fiancé follow him aboard a ship.  Following a storm, they end up shipwrecked on a tropical island with some of the other castaways.  They try to cooperate on the island, even as tensions flare.

Cast
Anita Page as Doris Evans
Charles Starrett as Gordon Wayne
Kenneth Thomson as John Franklin
Eddie Borden as Eddie Stevens
Gertrude Simpson as Laura
Jay Emmett as Jimmy
Clarence Geldart as Capt. Andersen

External links

1933 films
1933 adventure films
1933 crime drama films
American adventure films
American black-and-white films
American crime drama films
Films directed by Harry O. Hoyt
Monogram Pictures films
1930s English-language films
1930s American films